The 1980–81 DDR-Oberliga was the 32nd season of the DDR-Oberliga, the first tier of league football in East Germany.

The league was contested by fourteen teams. BFC Dynamo won the championship, the club's third of ten consecutive East German championships from 1978 to 1988.

Joachim Streich of 1. FC Magdeburg was the league's top scorer with 20 goals, while Hans-Ulrich Grapenthin of FC Carl Zeiss Jena took out the seasons East German Footballer of the year award.

On the strength of the 1980–81 title BFC Dynamo qualified for the 1981–82 European Cup where the club was knocked out by Aston Villa in the second round. Sixth-placed club 1. FC Lokomotive Leipzig qualified for the 1981–82 European Cup Winners' Cup as the seasons FDGB-Pokal winners and lost to FC Barcelona in the quarter finals. Second-placed FC Carl Zeiss Jena qualified for the 1981–82 UEFA Cup where it was knocked out in the second round by Real Madrid while third-placed 1. FC Magdeburg lost to Borussia Mönchengladbach in the first round and fourth-placed Dynamo Dresden was eliminated by Feyenoord Rotterdam in the second round.

Table									
The 1980–81 season saw two newly promoted clubs F.C. Hansa Rostock and BSG Chemie Böhlen.

Results

References

Sources

External links
 Das Deutsche Fussball Archiv  Historic German league tables

1980–81 in German football leagues
1980-81
1